Kunja may refer to:

 Kunja language (Papuan), a language of Papua New Guinea
 Kunja, a variety of the extinct Bidjara language of Australia
 Kunja people, who spoke that variety

See also 
 Kündja, a settlement in Võru County, Estonia
 Kunjra, a Muslim community of India